S. Craig Taylor Jr. was an American game designer who has worked primarily on board games and wargames.

Career
S. Craig Taylor Jr. first had a playtest credit on the 1962 version of Avalon Hill's version of Bismarck. Stephen Peek and Craig Taylor worked for wargame company Battleline Publications, which later merged into Heritage USA to speed its growth; when that did not work out Peek and Taylor took the opportunity to form Yaquinto Publications, a new wargame publisher. Taylor has been a playtester, designer, developer, researcher, rules writer, and producer for well over 100 board, miniature, card, and computer games for such publishers Battleline, Yaquinto, Avalon Hill, Microprose, Imagic, SouthPeak Games, TalonSoft, Lost Battalion Games, and Breakaway Games. Taylor's credits include such designs as Wooden Ships and Iron Men, Air Force, Flattop, Battle, Wings, Gettysburg: Smithsonian Edition, Sergeants, Battlegroup, and Gettysburg: Leading the Killer Angels.

References

1946 births
2012 deaths
Board game designers